Morganville is a community in the Canadian province of Nova Scotia, located in the District of Digby in Digby County, southeast of the town of Bear River.

References
Morganville on Destination Nova Scotia

Communities in Digby County, Nova Scotia
General Service Areas in Nova Scotia